Clanculus philippii, common name Philippi's cone, is a species of sea snail, a marine gastropod mollusk in the family Trochidae, the top snails.

Description
The size of the shell varies between 7 mm and 13 mm. The very solid shell has a conicalshape and is angulate at the periphery, with a very shallow umbilicus. It is white, variegated with maculations and radiating zigzag stripes of purplish red. The five whorls are planulate and turgid below the subcanaliculate sutures. The apical ones, when not eroded, are spirally striate, the following granose-lirate, the last bearing on its upper surface five coarse beaded lirae, the fifth forming the periphery. The base of the shell is slightly convex, bearing six beaded lirae. The interstices between the lirae are finely obliquely striate. The aperture is rounded-tetragonal, pearly within. The outer lip is lirate within. The basal lip is curved and subdenticulate. The short columella is hardly perceptibly folded above and dentate below. The umbilicus perforates scarcely deeper than the insertion of the straight columella.

Distribution
This marine species is endemic to Australia and occurs off South Australia, Tasmania, Victoria and Western Australia.

References

 Philippi, R.A. 1843. Abbildungen und Beschriebungen neuer oder wenig gekannter Conchylien. Cassel : T. Fischer Vol. 1 pp. 21–76
 Adams, A. 1853. Contributions towards a monograph of the Trochidae, a family of gastropodous Mollusca. Proceedings of the Zoological Society of London 1851(19): 150-192
 Crosse, H. 1863. Description d'espèces nouvelles. Journal de Conchyliologie 11: 379-386, pl. 13
 Angas, G.F. 1865. On the marine molluscan fauna of the Province of South Australia, with a list of all the species known up to the present time, together with remarks on their habitats and distribution, etc. Proceedings of the Zoological Society of London 1865: 155-"180" 
 Tenison-Woods, J.E. 1877. On some new Tasmanian marine shells. Papers and Proceedings of the Royal Society of Tasmania 1876: 131-159
 Tenison-Woods, J.E. 1879. Census; with brief descriptions of the marine shells of Tasmania and the adjacent islands. Proceedings of the Royal Society of Tasmania 1877: 26-57
 Fischer, P. 1879. Genres Calcar, Trochus, Xenophora, Tectarius et Risella. 337-463, 120 pls in Keiner, L.C. (ed.). Spécies general et iconographie des coquilles vivantes. Paris : J.B. Baillière Vol. 3.
 Tenison-Woods, J.E. 1880. On some Tasmanian Trochidae. Proceedings of the Royal Society of Tasmania 1879: 59-70 
 Tate, R. 1897. Critical remarks on some Australian Mollusca. Transactions of the Royal Society of South Australia 1897: 40-49
 Tate, R. & May, W.L. 1901. A revised census of the marine Mollusca of Tasmania. Proceedings of the Linnean Society of New South Wales 26(3): 344-471
 May, W.L 1903. On Tenison-Woods types in the Tasmanian Museum, Hobart. Proceedings of the Royal Society of Tasmania 1902: 106-114
 Hedley, C. 1913. Studies of Australian Mollusca. Part XI. Proceedings of the Linnean Society of New South Wales 38: 258-339
 Hardy, G.H. 1916. List of the Tenison Woods types of recent molluscs in the Tasmanian Museum. Proceedings of the Royal Society of Tasmania 1915: 68
 May, W.L. 1921. A Checklist of the Mollusca of Tasmania. Hobart, Tasmania : Government Printer 114 pp. 
 May, W.L. 1923. An Illustrated Index of Tasmanian Shells. Hobart : Government Printer 100 pp. 
 Cotton, B.C. & Godfrey, F.K. 1934. South Australian Shells. Part 11. South Australian Naturalist 15(3): 77-92 
 Cotton, B.C. 1959. South Australian Mollusca. Archaeogastropoda. Handbook of the Flora and Fauna of South Australia. Adelaide : South Australian Government Printer 449 pp.
 Wilson, B. 1993. Australian Marine Shells. Prosobranch Gastropods. Kallaroo, Western Australia : Odyssey Publishing Vol. 1 408 pp. 
 Jansen, P. 1995. A review of the genus Clanculus Montfort, 1810 (Gastropoda: Trochidae) in Australia, with description of a new subspecies and the introduction of a nomen novum. Vita Marina 43(1-2): 39-62

External links
 To Biodiversity Heritage Library (1 publication)
 To World Register of Marine Species
 

philippii
Gastropods of Australia
Gastropods described in 1843